George La Plata (October 17, 1924 – November 14, 2010) was a United States district judge of the United States District Court for the Eastern District of Michigan.

Education and career

Born in Detroit, Michigan, La Plata was in the United States Marine Corps during World War II, from 1943 to 1946 and during the Korean War, from 1952 to 1954. He received an Artium Baccalaureus degree from Wayne State University in 1951 and a Bachelor of Laws from Detroit College of Law in 1956. He was in private practice in Detroit from 1956 to 1979. He was a Circuit judge, Oakland County, Michigan from 1979 to 1985, and was a professor at the Detroit College of Law from 1985 to 1986.

Federal judicial service

On February 27, 1985, La Plata was nominated by President Ronald Reagan to a new seat on the United States District Court for the Eastern District of Michigan created by 98 Stat. 333. He was confirmed by the United States Senate on April 3, 1985, and received his commission on April 4, 1985. La Plata served in that capacity until his retirement, on August 3, 1996.

Death

La Plata died on November 14, 2010, in Naples, Florida, to where he had moved to after his retirement, at the age of 86.

See also
List of Hispanic/Latino American jurists
List of first minority male lawyers and judges in Michigan

References

Sources
 

1924 births
2010 deaths
Lawyers from Detroit
People from Naples, Florida
Wayne State University alumni
Detroit College of Law alumni
Detroit College of Law faculty
Hispanic and Latino American judges
Michigan state court judges
Judges of the United States District Court for the Eastern District of Michigan
United States district court judges appointed by Ronald Reagan
20th-century American judges
United States Marines
United States Marine Corps personnel of World War II
United States Marine Corps personnel of the Korean War